Hripsime Epremyan (born 27 July 1990) is an Armenian professional footballer. She currently plays for Armenia women's national football team.

See also
List of Armenia women's international footballers

External links
 
  
 
 

1990 births
Living people
Armenian women's footballers
Armenia women's international footballers
Women's association football forwards